Veloce Racing is a British motor racing team founded by Jean-Éric Vergne, Adrian Newey and Rupert Svendsen-Cook that competes in the all-electric off-road racing championship Extreme E and formerly in the all-female single-seater racing series, W Series.

Extreme E

2021
Veloce joined Extreme E for its inaugural season in 2021, announcing 2019 W Series champion Jamie Chadwick and former F1 and WRC driver Stéphane Sarrazin as their line-up. The team, racing with technical support from ART Grand Prix, won their first podium in the series at the 2021 Ocean X-Prix. Veloce finished the season 7th in the teams championship with a total of 77 points.

2022
On January 6, 2022, Veloce announced that Jamie Chadwick would be replaced for the 2022 season by Christine GZ. At the first round of the season in Saudi Arabia, Christine GZ fractured her foot while competing in Q1, requiring Hedda Hosås to replace her for the remainder of the round.

W Series

Veloce joined W Series for its second season in 2021, with reigning champion Jamie Chadwick and rookie Bruna Tomaselli as their inaugural driver line-up. At the second round of the season at the Red Bull Ring, Chadwick scored the team's first pole position, podium and win in W Series, beating Beitske Visser by a tenth of a second in qualifying, and driving to a commanding victory during the race. Ahead of round 3 at Silverstone Circuit, Veloce announced Mariella Bailey as the team's W Series team principal. During the final round of the season, with her win in the second race of the weekend at Circuit of the Americas, Jamie Chadwick won her second W Series championship, and the first for Veloce.

Results

Extreme E

Overview

Complete Extreme E results

(Races in bold indicate best qualifiers; races in italics indicate fastest super sector)

W Series

* Season still in progress

References

External links 

British auto racing teams
Auto racing teams established in 2021
2021 establishments in the United Kingdom